Sheffield is the seventh studio album by German hard dance band Scooter, released in 2000. It includes two singles: "I'm Your Pusher" and "She's the Sun" .

Track listing
All songs written by H.P. Baxxter, Rick J. Jordan, Axel Coon, and Jens Thele, except "I'm Your Pusher" co-written by Allan Gray and Walter Reisch; "Sex Dwarf" written by David Ball and Marc Almond; and "Summer Wine" written by Lee Hazlewood. All lyrics written by The Screaming Lord.
 "MC's Missing" - 1:16
 "Don't Gimme the Funk" - 4:13
 "I'm Your Pusher" - 3:59
 "Where Do We Go?" - 4:06
 "Sex Dwarf" - 4:20
 "She's the Sun" - 4:54
 "Space Cowboy" - 5:51
 "Never Slow Down" - 3:56
 "Down to the Bone" - 4:11
 "Summer Wine" - 3:58
 "Dusty Vinyl" - 4:53
 "Cubic" - 5:05
Sample credits
"MC's Missing" uses the sound of Big Ben chiming.
"I'm Your Pusher" samples the 1932 song "Flieger, grüß' mit mir die Sonne" by Hans Albers and Heinz Rühmann.
"Sex Dwarf" is a cover of the Soft Cell song, from the 1981 album Non-stop Erotic Cabaret.
"Summer Wine" is a cover of the 1967 song, originally performed by Nancy Sinatra and Lee Hazlewood.
"Never Slow Down" is very similar musically to Bomfunk MC's song "Freestyler", taken from the 1999 album In Stereo.
The drum loop in "She's the Sun" is sampled from the introduction of Led Zeppelin's version of "When the Levee Breaks", taken from the 1971 album Led Zeppelin IV.

Charts

References

2000 albums
Scooter (band) albums